Route nationale 34 (RN 34) is a primary highway in Madagascar of 456 km, running from Antsirabe to Malaimbandy. It crosses the regions of Amoron'i Mania and Menabe.

Selected locations on route
(east to west)
Antsirabe - (intersection with RN 7 from Antananarivo to Tulear)
Andohanankivoka
Miandrivazo 
Malaimbandy - (intersection with RN 34 to Morondava and Ambositra)

See also
List of roads in Madagascar
Transport in Madagascar

References

Roads in Amoron'i Mania
Roads in Menabe
Roads in Madagascar